The tornado outbreak of February 28 – March 2, 2007 was a deadly tornado outbreak across the southern United States that began in Kansas on February 28, 2007. The severe weather spread eastward on March 1 and left a deadly mark across the southern US, particularly in Alabama and Georgia. Twenty deaths were reported; one in Missouri, nine in Georgia, and 10 in Alabama. Scattered severe weather was also reported in North Carolina on March 2, producing the final tornado of the outbreak before the storms moved offshore into the Atlantic Ocean.

In the end, there were 56 tornadoes confirmed during the outbreak, including three EF3 tornadoes reported across three states, as well as three EF4 tornadoes; two in Alabama and one in Kansas, the first such tornadoes since the introduction of the Enhanced Fujita Scale. Total damages were estimated at over $580 million from tornadoes alone, making it the fourth-costliest tornado outbreak in US history (the figure not including damage from other thunderstorm impacts including hail and straight-line winds). Insured losses in the state of Georgia topped $210 million, making this outbreak the costliest in that state's history. Enterprise, Alabama, which was hit the hardest, sustained damages in excess of $307 million.

Meteorological synopsis 
The tornado outbreak was caused by a large low-pressure system across the central United States that intensified on February 28 over Kansas, and a cold front moved across the region, providing the lift needed to develop storms. Additionally, a surge of very moist air from the Gulf of Mexico and warm temperatures across the south side of the storm expanded these developments. Temperatures were in the 70s °F (low 20s °C) in some areas to the south, while the mercury was below freezing on the north side. The dewpoints were in the 60 °F (16 °C) range as far north as southeastern Kansas, which provided extra fuel.

The Storm Prediction Center issued a moderate risk of severe storms for February 28 across parts of the central Great Plains. The first tornadoes developed early in the evening that day in Kansas as the dry line pushed eastward and was lifted by the cold front. In total, 12 tornadoes formed that evening across Kansas and Missouri, 11 of which were weak; however, one of these tornadoes was rated an EF4, the first such tornado recorded and the first violent tornado since September 22 of the previous year. No one was injured by that storm. Farther south, expected activity in Oklahoma and Arkansas didn't take place as the atmospheric cap held up.

A high risk of severe storms — the first such issuance since April 7, 2006 — was issued for a large part of the Deep South for March 1 as the cold front moved eastward. The activity began almost immediately, with several isolated tornadoes taking place that morning across the Mississippi Valley, one of which caused the outbreak's first death. Isolated tornadoes were also reported as far north as Illinois, near the center of the low; however, the most intense activity began around noon and continued throughout the afternoon and evening, with southern Alabama and southern Georgia being hit the hardest. Nearly continuous supercells formed north of the Gulf of Mexico and produced many tornadoes, some of which hit large population centers with devastating effects. Those tornadoes killed twenty people.

The squall line finally overtook the supercells just after midnight on March 2, after putting down 37 tornadoes that day. As the squall line overtook the cells, a few tornadoes — all EF0 — took place overnight in Florida and extreme southern Georgia within the squall line, before the severe weather emerged in the Atlantic Ocean that morning. The final tornado was a landfalling waterspout in the Outer Banks of North Carolina late that morning. In addition to the tornadoes, widespread straight-line wind damage from microbursts were also reported, along with scattered large hail, the largest of which were the size of baseballs.

Confirmed tornadoes

February 28 event

March 1 event

March 2 event

Enterprise, Alabama

Early on the afternoon of Thursday, March 1, at 1:08 pm CST (19:08 UTC), a destructive tornado first developed near the Enterprise Municipal Airport. The tornado lifted off the ground briefly before returning to the ground as an even stronger storm. It quickly slammed into Enterprise, Alabama, at 1:12 pm CST (19:12 UTC). The tornado left severe damage throughout a large section of the city. The most severe damage took place at Enterprise High School, where a section of the school was destroyed during the middle of the school day. Eight students were killed at the school and 50 other people were taken to local hospitals. Some early reports suggested that there had been as many as 15 deaths at Enterprise High School and 18 deaths statewide, which was found to be an over-estimation. It was the first U.S. tornado to cause fatalities at a school since the Grand Isle, Louisiana tornado in 1993, and the deadliest tornado-related school disaster since one in Belvidere, Illinois in 1967. One other death was reported in Enterprise at a nearby private residence when a woman's living room window was shattered by the tornado.

At the school, the fatalities resulted from the collapse of a concrete block wall. One hallway completely collapsed, trapping many students in the rubble of the hallway known as 3rd Hall. The tornado at the school was so strong that it tossed and mangled cars in the parking lot, flattened parts of the stadium and tore trees out of the ground. School buses were there for an early dismissal due to the storms at just after 1:00 pm, but the tornado hit before the school could be dismissed.

Nearby Hillcrest Elementary School also sustained severe damage from the tornado. After the tornado hit, students from both schools who were not injured were relocated by emergency personnel to Hillcrest Baptist Church, adjacent to the schools and which was not damaged, in order to meet up with shocked parents. Emergency personnel also rushed to the school to send the most seriously injured to local hospitals and provide treatment on the scene to others.

The tornado initially formed in a neighborhood just south of the downtown area; after demolishing a section of the downtown area, it moved on to the schools. The tornado then continued northeast crossing the Holly Hill and Dixie Drive areas. A quarter-mile-wide (400 m) swath was devastated, with enormous damage reported to many houses and businesses, some of which were flattened. Several other schools and the local YMCA were among the damaged buildings. According to the Red Cross, 239 homes were destroyed, 374 sustained major damage, 529 sustained minor damage, and 251 homes were affected.

It dissipated shortly after leaving Enterprise. It was given an initial rating of EF3 on the Enhanced Fujita Scale. This upgrade was based on the finding of flattened houses near the school. A total of $307 million in damages were inflicted on the city of Enterprise.

Americus, Georgia

On the evening of March 1, Georgia's most significant tornado of the outbreak took place. No one was killed there but three people were injured as numerous buildings were damaged. The worst damage in the county occurred on East Centerpoint Road northeast of Chambliss. There, a cinder block house and two machine shops were destroyed, and a 25-foot section of asphalt was scoured from a nearby road. The three injuries occurred in the home, and 5 cows died on a nearby farm. A tractor-trailer near Chambliss was travelling on Highway 520 and was flipped over by the tornado. It caught fire and burned completely. At the intersection of the highway and TV Tower Road nearby, the Georgia Public Television transmission tower was damaged. Two-thirds of it was twisted and only  was left standing afterwards. Many trees and power lines were downed in the area.

In Sumter County, the tornado move northeast and, passing by Plains and stiking Americus. The worst damage was to the Sumter Regional Hospital; every building there was destroyed, causing $100 million in damage to the facility. The buildings included a row of doctors' offices and the Sumter HealthPlex, a newly built  facility. It went through demolition later in the year and did not reopen until 2011. Extensive damage was done elsewhere in the city. All casualties in the county were in Americus; two people, a 53-year-old man and 43-year-old woman, died in a house when a wall collapsed inside it. The tornado moved right over the downtown area and business district. The Winn-Dixie Supermarket was completely destroyed, and the McDonald's, Wendy's, Zaxby's, Domino's Pizza, and several more local businesses were damaged or destroyed. The tornado passed right through the National Register Historic District, damaging roughly 250 historical homes, several of which were destroyed. The city's most notable cemetery, the Oak Grove Cemetery, built in 1856, suffered moderate damage. The historic Rees Park High School sustained moderate damage but was not in use. Americus churches were not spared, as ten of them were damaged, including The Old Shady Grove Church. Parks were badly affected as well. Rees Park lost 25 trees and nearby Myers Park lost 39.

The toll for damage in the county amounted to $110 million. A total of 31 residences, 42 businesses, one church, and one hospital were destroyed. Another 116 residences, 27 businesses, two churches, and three recreation facilities / parks sustained major damage. Moderate damage was inflicted on 260 residences, 60 businesses, five churches, a school, three recreation facilities / parks, and 2 cemeteries. Minor damage was reported to 586 residences, 88 businesses, two churches, a school, a fire station, two recreation facilities / parks, and a cemetery. A total of 75 structures were destroyed, 148 sustained major damage, 331 sustained moderate damage, and 681 sustained minor damage (a total of 1,235 structures). Of these, 993 were residences, 217 were businesses, 10 were churches, two were schools, one was a hospital, one was a fire station, eight were recreation facilities / parks, and three were cemeteries. Two people died in the county and eight others were injured.

The tornado was rated as a strong EF3 on the Enhanced Fujita Scale. Two people died and 11 injured. Total damage was estimated at over $111 million, $110 million in Sumter county and $1 million in Webster County. Approximately 1,238 buildings (1,235 in Sumter and 3 in Webster), hundreds of vehicles, and much other property were damaged or destroyed.

Non-tornadic impacts
On the other side of the low-pressure area, a significant blizzard occurred over the northern Great Plains and Upper Midwest, including parts of Minnesota, Manitoba, Saskatchewan, Wisconsin, Iowa and Nebraska, where several snowfalls in excess of 8 to 18 inches (20–45 cm) were reported, as well as snow of between 6 and 11 inches (15–28 cm) across portions of Ontario and Quebec. Freezing rain was reported across New England, the lower Great Lakes in Ontario, Michigan, and in the Chicago area. 19 people were killed by the storm, including two in Manitoba, two in Ontario, one in Massachusetts, four in North Dakota, one in Minnesota, three in Michigan, five in Wisconsin and one in Nebraska. The University of Minnesota in the Twin Cities was closed for the first time since 1991 and the roof of a supermarket in Wisconsin collapsed. Minnesota Governor Tim Pawlenty called in the National Guard while governors Chet Culver (Iowa) and Michael Rounds (South Dakota) issued disaster declarations.

Aftermath

The National Guard was called into Enterprise in the aftermath of the tornado. Governor Bob Riley mobilized about 100 troops and placed more on standby. A dusk-to-dawn curfew was imposed on the community after the tornado strike. On the morning of March 3, President George W. Bush visited the community and declared Coffee County a disaster area. He went into the school and also took an aerial view of the devastation. The Federal Emergency Management Agency (FEMA) was also called in to provide additional assistance.

After the tornado, there was an investigation into whether the students should have been dismissed before the tornado struck the school. However, the National Weather Service survey from the office in Tallahassee suggested that the death toll could have been much higher due to the extreme damage in the parking lot and the area nearby. In addition, earlier thunderstorm activity in the area with two other rotating supercells tracking towards Enterprise late that morning (the first tornado warning was issued at 10:41 am CST) made evacuating the area unsafe.

In a later service assessment done by the NWS, it was determined that the school had taken the appropriate safety precautions to minimize and prevent potential loss of life with the tornado approaching, and the students were indeed in the safest part of the building. However, it was recommended in the assessment that hardened "safe rooms" with enhanced construction should exist, to prevent future disasters in the event of large and violent tornadoes impacting large buildings. A similar tornado on July 13, 2004 in Roanoke, Illinois, destroyed an industrial building, yet such rooms were used and no one there was seriously injured.

Enterprise was hit again by a weaker tornado on October 8, 2008; however, no one was injured.

See also 
 List of North American tornadoes and tornado outbreaks
 List of tornado-related deaths at schools
 Winter storms of 2006–07
 Tornado outbreak of February 28 – March 1, 2017

Notes

References

External links 

 NWS assessment: Tornadoes in Southern Alabama and Georgia on March 1, 2007
 Storm Prediction Center
 Enterprise Ledger newspaper coverage for the Enterprise tornado
 NWS Tallahassee, FL tornado outbreak summary
 NWS Atlanta/Peachtree City, GA Tornado Outbreak Page
 NWS Springfield, MO Tornado event page
 NWS Kansas City, MO Summary of Outbreak
 NWS Paducah, KY Tornado event page
 https://web.archive.org/web/20110520002821/http://www4.ncdc.noaa.gov/cgi-win/wwcgi.dll?wwevent~ShowEvent~652597
 https://web.archive.org/web/20110520002837/http://www4.ncdc.noaa.gov/cgi-win/wwcgi.dll?wwevent~ShowEvent~652427
 

F4 tornadoes by date
Tornadoes of 2007
Tornadoes in Alabama
Tornadoes in Georgia (U.S. state)
Tornadoes in Kansas
Tornadoes in Kentucky
Tornadoes in Missouri
Coffee County, Alabama
Sumter County, Georgia
2007 natural disasters in the United States
February 2007 events in the United States
Tornado outbreak